Babingtonia camphorosmae, commonly known as the camphor myrtle, is a shrub endemic to Western Australia.

It is found in the Wheatbelt, Peel and South West regions of Western Australia between Northam and Bridgetown and east as far as Katanning.

References

Eudicots of Western Australia
camphorosmae
Endemic flora of Western Australia
Plants described in 1842
Taxa named by John Lindley